Nice Dancer (1969–1997) was a Canadian Thoroughbred racehorse.

Background
He was from the last Canadian-sired crop of Northern Dancer before the International champion sire was relocated to Windfields Farm American subsidiary in Maryland.

Owned by Tom Morton and Dick Bonnycastle's Harlequin Ranches, Nice Dancer was trained by Jerry Lavigne.

Racing career
In his three-year-old season, the colt was ridden primarily by future Canadian and U.S. Hall of Fame jockey, Sandy Hawley.  In addition to important stakes races including the Manitoba Derby at  Assiniboia Downs in Winnipeg, Manitoba, Nice Dancer set a new Woodbine track record for a mile and three sixteenths in winning the inaugural running of the Col. R. S. McLaughlin Handicap. He won the third leg of the 1972 Canadian Triple Crown series, the Breeders' Stakes, a race run on turf at a distance of 1½ miles (12 furlongs). In the pre Sovereign Award era, Nice Dancer is historically viewed as the Canadian Champion 3-Year-Old Male Horse of 1972.

At age four, Nice Dancer won the Dominion Day Handicap and the Canadian Maturity Stakes before being retired to stud duty.

Stud record
He stood in Canada from 1974 to 1978 during which time he sired seventy-six foals out of which nine became stakes winners. His most notable offspring was Fiddle Dancer Boy, winner of the 1981 Queen's Plate. Sent to a breeding farm in Japan, Nice Dancer sired nine more stakes winners before his death at age twenty-eight in 1997. He is the damsire of Glide Path, winner of the 1995 Stockholm Cup International, Sweden's most important race.

Pedigree

References
 Nice Dancer's pedigree and partial racing stats

1969 racehorse births
1997 racehorse deaths
Racehorses bred in Canada
Racehorses trained in Canada
Horse racing track record setters
Canadian Champion racehorses
Thoroughbred family 1-e